Connecticut's 112th House of Representatives district elects one member of the Connecticut House of Representatives. It consists of the town of Monroe and part of Shelton. It has been represented by Republican Tony Scott since 2021.

Recent elections

2021 special

2020

2018

2016

2014

2012

References

112